The 2008 Thailand Open was a men's tennis tournament played on indoor hard courts. It was the 6th edition of the Thailand Open, and was part of the International Series of the 2008 ATP Tour. It took place at the Impact Arena in Bangkok, Thailand, from 22 September through 28 September 2008.

The singles field was led by ATP No. 3, Australian Open champion, French Open and US Open semifinalist, Indian Wells and Rome Masters winner Novak Djokovic, Australian Open runner-up Jo-Wilfried Tsonga, Miami Masters semifinalist, Båstad finalist Tomáš Berdych. Also lined up were French Open semifinalist Gaël Monfils, Australian Open quarterfinalist Jarkko Nieminen, Robin Söderling, Marat Safin and Jürgen Melzer.

Finals

Singles

 Jo-Wilfried Tsonga defeated  Novak Djokovic, 7–6(7–4), 6–4
It was Jo-Wilfried Tsonga's 1st career title.

Doubles

 Lukáš Dlouhý /  Leander Paes defeated  Scott Lipsky /  David Martin, 6–4, 7–6(7–4)

External links
Official website
Singles draw
Doubles draw
Qualifying Singles draw